Aquinas School is a private Catholic all-boys basic education institution run by the Philippine Dominican Province of the Order of Preachers in San Juan, Metro Manila, Philippines. It was founded in 1965 and named after Thomas Aquinas, the patron saint of all Catholic schools and universities.

Notable alumni

References

External links
Aquinas School Official Website
Dave Vergel B. Castro and Associates Official Website

Boys' schools in the Philippines
Catholic elementary schools in Metro Manila
Catholic secondary schools in Metro Manila
Dominican educational institutions in the Philippines
Schools in San Juan, Metro Manila